Maximum is a fictional superhero published by DC Comics. He first appeared in Supermen of America vol. 2 #1 (March 2000), and was created by Fabian Nicieza and Doug Braithwaite.

Fictional character biography
Maxwell Williams was a young African-American high school athlete with a bright future ahead of him, but became a quadriplegic after a tragic accident, and would have remained so without specially designed surgical implants provided by LexCorp. The Lexcorp implants made Maxwell more than human and he used his new powers to fight crime in Suicide Slum under the name of Maximum. After Psilencer's untimely death, Outburst and his inexperienced teammates in the Supermen of America were deeply shaken and reconsidered their vocation. It was around this time that the team met and recruited Max. Unlike the rest of the Supermen, Maximum's identity was public record.

A disgruntled Lexcorp employee discovered that S.T.A.R. Labs had hidden a capsule inside a special holding chamber called Lockdown 6 in the waters near Metropolis. Luthor successfully deployed Pyrogen to retrieve the capsule from Lockdown 6, but he encountered the Deep Six and was rebuffed. Darkseid, lord of Apokolips, also wanted the contents of Lockdown 6 and had sent the Deep Six to retrieve them. In the Vega system, the Warlords of Okaara sensed the danger presented by the capsule, and took preventative measures.

The Okaarans overpowered Earth's defensive forces and White Lotus desperately rushed to negotiate a peace settlement before they "cleansed' the planet. While White Lotus was negotiating with the Okaarans in order to save Earth from worse attacks, the chamber was opened and the Unimaginable was unleashed. The Unimaginable's energy form possessed Maximum and he temporarily gained the powers of a god. With these powers, Max decides to transform Metropolis into the paradise he believes it should be, even if it means fighting his own team to do so. The hero known as Loser uses his null field to slow Max down until they can talk him down. Max's parents eventually convinced him to relinquish the power, which he dispersed safely.

Powers and abilities
 Maximum's powers closely resembled those of Ultra Boy from the Legion of Superheroes. Max's powers come directly from the Lexcorp implant, he can use the implant to channel all his body's energies in order to maximize his strength, physical speed, reflexes, or his senses up to superhuman levels. 
 He can only maximize one ability at a time.

External links
Great Krypton: Supermen of America (Vol. 2) #1
Cosmic Teams Entry

DC Comics superheroes
African-American superheroes
DC Comics characters with superhuman strength